Tarascosaurus ("Tarasque lizard") is a genus of abelisaurid theropod dinosaur from Late Cretaceous of France.

Discovery
 
After having in 1988 identified an upper jaw bone found near Pourcieux as belonging to a member of the Abelisauridae, French paleontologist Éric Buffetaut reviewed the known remains of larger theropods found in the Late Cretaceous of Europe concluding they all were of abelisaurid affinity. Most of these fossils, earlier named as Megalosaurus pannoniensis, Megalosaurus hungaricus and Megalosaurus lonzeensis, he considered to be nomina dubia because of the paucity of the material. However, when in the collection of the University of Lyon he discovered some theropod bones once excavated by an unknown collector at an escarpment of a place named Lambeau du Beausset, in the "syncline of Le Beausset" (in French: synclinal du Beausset), Buffetaut and Jean Le Loeuff named and described these in 1991 as the type species Tarascosaurus salluvicus. The generic name is derived from the Tarasque or Tarasca, a devouring monster from Occitan and Spanish folklore. The specific name refers to the Salluvii, a Gallic tribe in Antiquity inhabiting the area near Marseilles.

The holotype PSL 330201 was found in the Fuvelian Beds, dating from the lower Campanian. PSL 330202, consisting of two dorsal vertebrae, was made a paratype; these bones may belong to the same individual. Referred was PSL 330203, a damaged tail vertebra. Some fossils from Spain were also referred to the genus, such as specimen FSL 330202, which was estimated to be 3.1 meters long, 90 kg, and 98 cm high at the hips, making Tarascosaurus one of the smallest abelisaurids.

In 2003 Oliver Rauhut concluded that Tarascosaurus itself was also a nomen dubium because the material was not diagnostic.

Tarascosaurus was placed in the Abelisauridae in 1991. It was then seen as the only known abelisaurid from the Northern Hemisphere apart from Betasuchus of the Maastrichtian of the Netherlands. However, in 2003 Ronan Allain et al. concluded that the type lacked any uniquely abelisaurid traits.

See also

 Timeline of ceratosaur research

References

External links
 Ampelosaurus atacis and Tarascosaurus salluvicus by Alain Bénéteau (Paleospot.com)
  Description of Tarascosaurus

Abelisaurids
Campanian life
Late Cretaceous dinosaurs of Europe
Cretaceous France
Fossils of France
Fossil taxa described in 1991
Taxa named by Éric Buffetaut